South African recording artist Cassper  has released 5 studio albums, 24 singles and 12 music videos. Nyovest's music has been released on record labels Universal Music South Africa and Family Tree Records.

Studio albums

Singles

References 

Discographies of South African artists
Hip hop discographies